The Central Saanich Police Service is the police force for the district municipality of Central Saanich, British Columbia, Canada. Currently headed by Chief Constable Ian Lawson with 28 constables, five of whom are seconded to Combined Forces Special Enforcement Unit (CFSEU), regional crime unit, IRSU and the National Weapons Enforcement Support Team

History
The Central Saanich Police Department came to life when the Corporation of the District of Central Saanich was created in 1951. It was later renamed to the present name of Central Saanich Police Service in the late 1990s.

Integrated Road Safety Unit (IRSU)
One CSPS officer is seconded to the 15 member unit IRSU. IRSU is mandated to "providing intelligence led enforcement while targeting aggressive driving behaviors, reducing alcohol-related crashes and encouraging the use of seatbelts" within the Capital Regional District. This unit consists of officers from several police departments, including the Saanich Police Department, Victoria Police Department, Oak Bay Police Department, Central Saanich Police and the RCMP under an agreement with the BC Ministry of Public Safety and the solicitor general. They patrol in specially marked cars and are able to enforce laws outside their municipal jurisdictions.

See also
 Combined Forces Special Enforcement Unit of British Columbia

References

External links
 Central Saanich Police Service

Law enforcement agencies of British Columbia